Schöndorf may refer to the following places in Germany:

Schöndorf, Rhineland-Palatinate, in the Trier-Saarburg district, Rhineland-Palatinate
Schöndorf, Thuringia, in the Saale-Orla-Kreis, Thuringia
a part of Waldfeucht, North Rhine-Westphalia
a part of Weimar, Thuringia

and to:
 Schöndorf, the German name for Frumușeni Commune, Arad County, Romania